Magic 105 was a pirate "border blaster" radio station broadcasting to Northern Ireland from the Republic of Ireland. The station format was "Hot Adult Contemporary" (Hot AC) and only played songs from the 1970s and 1980s.  The exception to this rule was during its "Afterhours" show (9pm-Midnight) when a mixture of classic love songs and modern chill-out tunes were played.

From a transmission site in County Monaghan, Magic 105 broadcast across the border into the North. The original transmitter and mast was located at "Alien Mountain", so called due to alleged UFO activity. The real name of the area is known as Greagh, approx 2 miles northwest of Carrickroe, Co. Monaghan.  Due to the remote location of the Alien Mountain transmission site, a satellite ADSL service was used to maintain the automation computer's playlists and provide a live streaming facility for presenters to present live shows from various locations.

The station also has links with other border stations such as: Drive 105, Energy FM, Galaxy 107 and Storm 106. Drive 105 was awarded a Community Radio licence in June 2007 by UK radio regulator, OFCOM.

Past Presenters
Andy Stewart, Andy York aka "Yorkie", Ben Gamblin, Charlie Davy, Danno Fox, Lenny Preston aka Peter Nicholls, Nick Cousins, Philip Patrick, Ricky Williams, Sandy & Shelly, Scott Richards, Sean Stevens aka "The Magician".

Demise
The last broadcast from Magic 105 was on 11 May 2007 when the station's transmitter was seized by ComReg from Bragan Mountain, close to the original Greagh site. As of July 2008, there are currently no plans for Magic 105 to return to the airwaves.

Radio stations in Ireland
Radio stations in Northern Ireland